Çaylı (also, Chayly) is a village and municipality in the Qazakh Rayon of Azerbaijan.  It has a population of 6,878.

References 

Populated places in Qazax District